A dome is a self-supporting structural element of architecture that resembles the hollow upper half of a sphere.

Every dome in the world which was the largest dome of its time is listed below. The defining criterion is in each case the inner diameter of the largest circular cross-section of the dome.

Worldwide 

Below is a list of buildings that have held the title of the largest dome in the world.

By continent 
Below is a list of buildings that have held the title of the largest dome on their continent.

Europe 

It collapsed on January 25, 1986. 

In 1990, the  diameter building named "Kupolen" (the Dome) was completed in Borlänge, Sweden. Originally an exposition hall with a few stores at ground level, today a mall in three levels.

North America

South America

Asia

Africa

Australia

By structure 
Below is a list of buildings that have held the title of the largest dome in terms of their structure.

Famous large domes 
Below is a list of large domes which are considered particularly important for various reasons but have never held the title of the largest dome in the world.

See also 

 List of tallest domes
 List of Roman domes

References

Sources 

Lists of construction records
Largest
Ceilings
Domes
Domes